Pseudoeurycea amuzga, which has been given the common name of Sierra de Malinaltepec salamander, is a species of salamander in the family Plethodontidae. It is endemic to Mexico and known only from Sierra de Malinaltepec, a part of Sierra Madre del Sur in the Guerrero state. 

It has been found under rocks, in holes, and under the bark of trees. It is threatened by habitat loss caused by small-scale farming and wood extraction.

References

amuzga
Endemic amphibians of Mexico
Fauna of the Sierra Madre del Sur
Taxonomy articles created by Polbot
Amphibians described in 2003